Telyatnikovo is a rural locality in Ivanchikovsky Selsoviet Rural Settlement, Lgovsky District, Kursk Oblast, Russia. Population:

Geography 
The village is located 58 km from the Russia–Ukraine border, 61.5 km west of Kursk, 5 km north-east of the district center – the town Lgov, 3 km from the selsoviet center – Ivanchikovo.

 Climate
Telyatnikovo has a warm-summer humid continental climate (Dfb in the Köppen climate classification).

Transport 
Telyatnikovo is located 12.5 km from the road of regional importance  (Kursk – Lgov – Rylsk – border with Ukraine) as part of the European route E38, 2 km from the road  (Lgov – Konyshyovka), 18 km from the road of intermunicipal significance  (38K-017 – Nikolayevka – Shirkovo), on the road  (38K-023 – Olshanka – Marmyzhi – 38N-362), 3 km from the nearest railway halt Maritsa (railway line Navlya – Lgov-Kiyevsky).

The rural locality is situated 68 km from Kursk Vostochny Airport, 150 km from Belgorod International Airport and 271 km from Voronezh Peter the Great Airport.

References

Notes

Sources

Rural localities in Lgovsky District